Abdulhack Ahmed 'Jack' Manack (born 21 August 1967 in Vereeniging) is a former South African first-class cricketer who played for Transvaal and Western Province in the Howa Bowl.

Manack, one of the competition's most outstanding bowlers, was the leading Howa Bowl wicket-taker in a record five seasons, including each of the last four. He was particularly consistent for Transvaal and averaged under 20 with the ball every season from 1985/86 to 1990/91. He represented Western Province in just one season, helping them to the title in 1989/90. His best bowling performance came that season when he took 7 for 17 to dismiss Eastern Province for just 50 runs, which prompted Western Province's captain to make an unusual declaration when it was their turn to bat, calling the openers back after just one ball. Western Province went on to win by three wickets.

References

External links

1967 births
Living people
South African cricketers
Western Province cricketers
Gauteng cricketers